Suzane Carvalho (Rio de Janeiro, 26 December 1963) is a Brazilian racing driver and former-actress. In 1992 she won the Formula 3 Sudamericana Class B Championship and became the first and only woman to ever win a Formula Three Championship. After this, she joined Guinness Book.

References

External links 

Official Website:

Actresses from Rio de Janeiro (city)
1963 births
Living people
Sportspeople from Rio de Janeiro (city)

Brazilian female racing drivers
Brazilian racing drivers